Sutu may refer to:
Sutu, Estonia
Sutu, Iran
Şutu, Romania
Sutu, pseudonym of Stu Campbell, Australian comic book artist
Soutzos family, a Greek family
Shutu or Sutu, the name given in ancient Akkadian language sources to certain nomadic groups of the Trans-Jordanian highlands